William Tatem Quillen (1935–2016) was a politician from Delaware. He served on the Delaware Supreme Court from 1978 to 1983, and as Secretary of State of Delaware from 1993 to 1994, during the administration of Governor Tom Carper. His daughter Tracey Carney is married to Governor John Carney, and is the current First Lady of Delaware.

References 

Secretaries of State of Delaware
Justices of the Delaware Supreme Court
Williams College alumni
1935 births
2016 deaths
20th-century American judges